Kostas Oikonomopoulos (alternate spelling: Ekonomopoulos) (Greek: Κώστας Οικονομόπουλος; born September 23, 1996) is a Greek professional basketball player who last played for Kolossos Rodou of the Greek Basket League. He is a 1.94 m (6'4 ") tall combo guard.

Professional career
Oikonomopoulos began his club career with the Greek minor league club Milon, playing in the Greek 4th Division, in the 2012–13 season. In 2014, he moved to the Greek club Panionios. In 2015, he moved to the Greek club Kolossos Rodou.

On August 18, 2020, Oikonomopoulos joined St. Pölten in Austria. The following year, he returned to Greece, and joined Tritonas of the Greek 2nd Division. After one moth with the club, he left in order to return to Austria, for the Klosterneuburg Dukes. In May 2022, he returned to Kolossos for the rest of the season. In 3 games, he averaged 0.7 points and 0.7 steals in under 5 minutes per contest.

National team career
With the junior national teams of Greece, Oikonomopoulos played at the 2012 FIBA Europe Under-16 Championship, the 2014 FIBA Europe Under-18 Championship, and the 2015 FIBA Europe Under-20 Championship.

References

External links
RealGM.com Profile
FIBA Europe Profile
Eurobasket.com Profile

1996 births
Living people
Charilaos Trikoupis B.C. players
Ethnikos Piraeus B.C. players
Greek men's basketball players
Kolossos Rodou B.C. players
Milon B.C. players
Panionios B.C. players
Point guards
Rethymno B.C. players
Shooting guards
Basketball players from Athens